The Samsung Galaxy J4 is an Android smartphone developed by the South Korean manufacturer Samsung Electronics. Announced on May 22, 2018 and released the same day, the J4 is the successor to the Galaxy J3.

Specifications

Hardware 
The Galaxy J4 is powered by an Exynos 7570 SoC including a quad-core 1.4 GHz ARM Cortex-A53 CPU, an ARM Mali-T720MP2 GPU and 2 or 3 GB RAM. The either 16 or 32 GB internal storage can be expanded up to 256 GB via microSD card.

The J4 features a 5.5-inch Super AMOLED display with a 720×1280 pixel display resolution and a pixel density of 267 ppi which is protected by 2.5D Glass. The rear camera has a 13 MP sensor with f/1.9 aperture, autofocus, LED flash, panorama and HDR mode. The front camera features 5 MP and f/2.2 aperture.

Software 
The Galaxy J4 is originally shipped with Android 8.0 "Oreo" and Samsung's Experience user interface.

See also 
 Samsung Galaxy
 Samsung Galaxy J series

References

External links 

Android (operating system) devices
Samsung Galaxy
Samsung smartphones
Mobile phones introduced in 2018
Discontinued smartphones
Mobile phones with user-replaceable battery